Francis Wayland Ayer (February 4, 1848March 5, 1923) was an American advertising businessman.

Ayer was born to Nathaniel Wheeler Ayer and Joanna B. Wheeler in Lee, Massachusetts, though he was raised in western New York. Ayer's mother died when he was three years old, and his father remarried Harriett Amanda Post. Ayer taught in district schools and spent one year studying at the University of Rochester before moving to Philadelphia.  There he was hired by a religious newspaper for the position of an advertising solicitor, but by 1867 he founded the company, N. W. Ayer & Son, which he named after his father to give a degree of longevity and credibility to the business (Fox, 1984).  Besides himself, he began with only a bookkeeper and US$25.    

In 1873 his father Nathaniel died.  Two years later he married his first wife, Rhandera Gilman. That same year he introduced the "open contract".

In 1914 his first wife died, and five years later he remarried Martha K. Lawson.

References
Ingham, John N. Biographical Dictionary of American Business Leaders A-G. Greenwook Publishing Group, 1983.  p. 31-32
 1860 U.S. census, population schedule. NARA microfilm publication M653, 1,438 rolls. Washington, D.C.: National Archives and Records Administration, n.d.

External links
Biography at the Center for Interactive Advertising

1848 births
1923 deaths
People from Lee, Massachusetts
19th-century American businesspeople
20th-century American businesspeople
American advertising executives